Cartagena or Carthagena may refer to:

Places

Chile
Cartagena, Chile, a commune in Valparaíso Region

Colombia
Cartagena, Colombia, a city in the Bolívar Department, the largest city with this name
Roman Catholic Archdiocese of Cartagena, an archdiocese located in the city of Cartagena in Colombia
Cartagena Province, a historical province that was part of the Republic of Gran Colombia, of which the eponymous city was the capital
Cartagena Refinery, an oil refinery in Cartagena, Colombia. It is operated by Refineria de Cartagena S.A. (Reficar), a subsidiary of Ecopetrol
Cartagena del Chairá, a town and municipality in the department of Caquetá

Spain
Cartagena, Spain, a city in the Region of Murcia
Roman Catholic Diocese of Cartagena, the diocese of the city of Cartagena in the Ecclesiastical province of Granada in Spain
Campo de Cartagena, a comarca in the Region of Murcia, southeastern Spain

United States
Carthagena, Ohio, an unincorporated community in Mercer County, Ohio

People
Alfonso de Cartagena (1384–1456), Jewish-Spanish Catholic bishop, diplomat, historian and writer
Carlos Mauricio Funes Cartagena (born 1959), a Salvadorian politician, president starting 2009
Cristóbal Ramírez de Cartagena (1583–1584), Spanish colonial administrator in Peru
Fulgentius of Cartagena (6th century–630), a Spanish Catholic bishop
José N. Gándara Cartagena (1907–1954), a Puerto Rican physician and public servant
Joseph Cartagena or Fat Joe (born 1970), an American rapper
Juan de Cartagena (died c. 1520), Spanish accountant, captain of the San Antonio during Ferdinand Magellan's circumnavigation
Juan José Cartagena (1876–1881), Puerto Rican mayor
Miguel Cartagena (born 1992), Puerto Rican-American boxer
Modesto Cartagena (1921–2010), highly decorated Puerto Rican soldier
Nicolás Nogueras Cartagena (born 1935), a Puerto Rican politician and commentator
Raúl Gándara Cartagena (1895–1989), Puerto Rican fire chief
Teresa de Cartagena (born c. 1420), Spanish nun and author
Victoria Cartagena (born 1985), American actress

Arts, entertainment, and media
Cartagena (board game), a German-style board game released in 2000, that takes as its theme the legendary 1672 pirate-led jailbreak from the dreaded fortress of Cartagena
Cartagena (film), a 2009 film
Cartagena (novel), a 2015 novel by Claudia Amengual
Cartagena Film Festival, in Cartagena, Colombia
Neo Cartagena, a fictitious lunar city in Mobile Suit Victory Gundam that developed mobile armors for the Zanscare Empire

Historical events
Battle of Cartagena (209 BC), a battle in what is now Cartagena, Spain
Battle of Cartagena (461), a naval battle off what is now Cartagena, Spain
Battle of Cartagena (1643), a naval battle off Cartagena, Spain
Raid on Cartagena (1697), a siege of Cartagena, Colombia
Battle of Cartagena de Indias, a 1741 battle in Cartagena, Colombia
Battle of Cartagena (1758), a naval battle Cartagena, Spain 
Cartagena Manifesto, an 1812 document written in Cartagena, Colombia
Cartagena uprising, a 1939 (Spanish Civil War) uprising in Cartagena, Spain

Sports teams
Cartagena CF, a football club based in Cartagena, Spain
Cartagena FC, a football club based in Cartagena, Spain
FC Cartagena, a football club based in Cartagena, Spain
FS Cartagena, a futsal club based in Cartagena, Spain
Real Cartagena, a football club based in Cartagena, Colombia

Other uses
Cartagena Protocol on Biosafety, an international agreement on biosafety, as a supplement to the Convention on Biological Diversity
Cartagena (Madrid Metro), a station on Line 7
Cartagena (Mexibús), a BRT station in Tultitlán, Mexico

See also
Carthage (disambiguation)

Spanish-language surnames
Surnames of Spanish origin